Bechem United Football Club (officially: Bechem United Football Club or the "Hunters") is a Ghanaian professional football club, based in Bechem in the Ahafo Region They are competing in the Ghanaian Premier League and currently participating in the 2017 CAF Confederation Cup. They are current Champions of the Ghana FA Cup (2015–16).

Club history 
Bechem United has a long history of rivalry with Brong Ahafo (BA) Stars and Berekum Chelsea. In 2007, the youth team of Bechem United took part in the Trofeo Karol Wojtyla, a youth tournament in the Italian Commune of Fiumicino, Province of Rome, Lazio region.

In September 2011, Bechem United were crowned champions of the Poly Tank Division One League Zone 1 and promoted to the 2011–12 season of the Glo Premier League. On 10 October 2011, Eric Fordjour scored the club's first top flight goal after scoring penalty in their league opener against Aduana Stars, the match however ended in 3–2 loss.

On 5 November 2011, the club earned their first league point after 1–1 draw against Aduana Stars, Bechem's goal was scored by Richard Addae  in the 18th minute of the match. Richard Addae ended their debut season as the club's top goal scorer and the league's third top goal scorer with 11 goals.

FA Cup Champions
Bechem United won the Ghanaian FA Cup 2015–2016 for the first time in the club History after they claimed a 2–1 win over Okwawu United at the Cape Coast Stadium in September 2016. Yaw Annor scored the brace in the final.

Daniel Egyin served as club captain from 2018 to 2019 after the departure of Asante Agyemang.

Grounds 
The club plays its home games in the Glo Premier League from the Nana Gyeabour's Park, since the club's original home, the Bechem park is (5,000 capacity), and the requirements of the Glo Premier League made it fall short of the required capacity.

Current squad

Management

Club captains 

 Asante Agyemang (2017–2018)
 Daniel Egyin (2018–2019)
 Prince Asempa (2019–2020)
 Moro Salifu (2020–2021)

Notable coaches 
 Mohammed Adil Erradi (2015-2016)
 Romain Folz (2020)

Honours

FA Cup: 1
 2016

Ghana Super Cup:
 Runners up: 2017
Poly Tank Division One League Zone 1: 1
 2010–11

References and notes 

Football clubs in Ghana
1966 establishments in Ghana
Association football clubs established in 1966
Brong-Ahafo Region